This is a list of the varieties of traditional cheeses made in Switzerland. Switzerland produces over 475 varieties of cheese, a milk-based food produced in a large range of flavors, textures, and forms. Cow's milk is used in about 99 percent of the cheeses Switzerland produces. The remaining share is made up of sheep milk and goat milk. The export of these cheeses, some 40% of production in 2019, is economically important for Switzerland.

The best known Swiss cheeses are of the class known as Swiss-type cheeses, also known as Alpine cheeses, a group of hard or semi-hard cheeses with a distinct character, whose origins lie in the Alps of Europe, although they are now eaten and imitated in most cheesemaking parts of the world. These include  Emmental, Gruyère and Appenzeller, as well as many other traditional varieties from Switzerland and neighbouring countries with Alpine regions. Their distinct character arose from the requirements of cheese made in the summer on high Alpine grasslands (alpage in French), and then transported with the cows down to the valleys in the winter, in the historic culture of Alpine transhumance. Traditionally the cheeses were made in large rounds or "wheels" with a hard rind, to provide longevity to the shelf-life.  

Technically Swiss-type cheeses are "cooked", meaning made using thermophilic lactic fermentation starters, incubating the curd with a period at a high temperature of 45°C or more.  Since they are later pressed to expel excess moisture, the group are also described as "'cooked pressed cheeses'", fromages à pâte pressée cuite in French. Most varieties have few if any holes, or holes that are much smaller than the large holes found in some Emmental or its imitations. The general eating characteristics of the cheeses are a firm but still elastic texture, flavour that is not sharp, acidic or salty, but rather nutty and buttery. When melted, which they often are in cooking, they are "gooey", and "slick, stretchy and runny".

Varieties

Extra-hard

Sbrinz
Berner Hobelkäse AOP

Hard 
Appenzeller
Berner Alpkäse
Bündner Bergkäse
Gruyère/Greyerzer (AOP)
L'Etivaz (AOP)
Röthenbacher Bergkäse
Mutschli
Schabziger 
Tête de Moine (AOP)

Semi-hard 

Emmentaler
Raclette du Valais (AOP)
Scharfe Maxx
Le Marechal
Tilsiter
Vacherin Fribourgeois (AOP)

Semi-soft 
Formaggini
Luzerner Rahmkäse

Soft 
Vacherin Mont d'Or
Gala
Büsciun da cavra
Tomme Vaudoise

Blue 
Bleuchâtel

See also
List of cheeses
List of dairy products
Swiss Cheese Union
Swiss cheese (North America)

Notes

References
Donnelley, Catherine W. (ed), Cheese and Microbes, 2014, ASM Press, 9781555818593, google books
Lortal, Sylvie, "Cheeses made with Thermophilic Lactic Starters", Chapter 16 in Handbook of Food and Beverage Fermentation Technology, 2004, CRC Press, 9780203913550, google books 
"Oxford": Donnelley, Catherine W. (ed), The Oxford Companion to Cheese, 2016, Oxford University Press, 9780199330881, google books 
Thorpe, Liz, The Book of Cheese: The Essential Guide to Discovering Cheeses You'll Love, 2017, Flatiron Books, 9781250063465, google books

External links 

 Cheeses from Switzerland, Switzerland Cheese Marketing

Swiss cheese

Cheese